Manta Sport Club was an Ecuadorian professional football club based in Manta. Founded in 1915, it spent the majority of its years bouncing between the top-flight Serie A and the Serie B until 1985. Statistically, it is the most successful club from Manta. The club later folded in 1996 after 10 years in the Segunda Categoría. The club dissolved a little after 81 years of existence when it ceded its team to Manta FC.

Achievements
Serie B
Winner (2): 1979 E1, 1982 E2

References

Defunct football clubs in Ecuador
Association football clubs established in 1915
Association football clubs disestablished in 1996
1915 establishments in Ecuador
1996 disestablishments in Ecuador